The Severinghaus electrode is an electrode that measures carbon dioxide (CO2). It was developed by Dr. John W. Severinghaus and his technician A. Freeman Bradley in 1958.

It utilizes a CO2-sensitive glass electrode in a surrounding film of bicarbonate solution covered by a thin plastic carbon dioxide permeable membrane, but impermeable to water and electrolytic solutes. The carbon dioxide pressure of a sample gas or liquid equilibrates through the membrane and the glass electrode measures the resulting pH of the bicarbonate solution.

Clark, galvanic, and paramagnetic electrodes measure oxygen.  Severinghaus electrode measures .  Sanz electrode measures pH.

References

External links
 

Electrodes
Gas sensors